Yau Ma Tei North is one of the 19 constituencies in the Yau Tsim Mong District of Hong Kong which was first created in 1982 and recreated in 2015.

The constituency loosely covers Yau Ma Tei with the estimated population of 12,817.

Councillors represented

1982–85

1985–94

2015 to present

Election results

2010s

1990s

1980s

References

Constituencies of Hong Kong
Constituencies of Yau Tsim Mong District Council
1982 establishments in Hong Kong
Constituencies established in 1982
2015 establishments in Hong Kong
Constituencies established in 2015
Yau Ma Tei